The 2016 Summer Olympics in Rio de Janeiro was televised by a number of broadcasters throughout the world. As with previous years, Olympic Broadcasting Services produced the world feed provision to local broadcasters for use in their coverage. In most regions, broadcast rights to the 2016 Summer Olympics were packaged together with those for the 2014 Winter Olympics, but some broadcasters obtained rights to further games as well.

List of broadcasters

 – Rights in 16 countries in Asia, to be resold to local broadcasters.
 – Rights to be resold to local broadcasters.
 – Rights in each country to be resold to local broadcasters, except France, Germany, Italy, Spain, Ireland and the United Kingdom.
 – Rights were originally acquired by Sky Italia, but the broadcaster sold them in 2013 to Rai.
 – Rights in all Latin America countries, except Brazil.
 – Rights in Cook Islands, Fiji, Kiribati, Marshall Islands, Federated States of Micronesia, Nauru, Niue, Palau, Samoa, Solomon Islands, Tonga, Tuvalu and Vanuatu.

References

2016 Summer Olympics broadcasters
2016
Olympics on Canadian television
Olympics on United States television
Broadcasters